The 2010 USA Cycling Professional Tour is the fourth year of this elite men's professional road bicycle racing series organized by USA Cycling.

David Zabriskie (342 points) and Team Columbia-HTC (469 points) are the defending champion of the overall individual and team titles, respectively.

Events 
The 2010 USA Cycling Professional Tour consists of the following 8 one-day races and stage races:

References 

USA Cycling Professional Tour, 2009
USA
USA